Minuscule 163 (in the Gregory-Aland numbering), ε 114 (Soden), is a Greek minuscule manuscript of the New Testament, on parchment. It is dated by its colophon to the year 1193 (?). It has complex contents and full marginalia.

Description 

The codex contains a complete text of the four Gospels on 173 thick parchment leaves (size ). The text is written in two columns per page, in 33 lines per page, ink is black.

There is also a division according to the Ammonian Sections (in Mark 237 – the last section in 16:15), with references to the Eusebian Canons (written below Ammonian Section numbers).

Text 

Kurt Aland the Greek text of the codex  did not place in any Category.

According to the Claremont Profile Method it creates textual cluster 163 and textual pair with 345.

History 

It was written in Syria, in 1193 (?).

It was examined by Birch (about 1782) and Scholz (1794-1852). Scholz ascribed it as "solumnodo pericopas in ecclesia legi sotitas". C. R. Gregory saw it in 1886.

It is currently housed at the Vatican Library (Barberini, gr. 520), at Rome.

See also 
 List of New Testament minuscules
 Biblical manuscript
 Textual criticism

References

Further reading 

 

Greek New Testament minuscules
12th-century biblical manuscripts
Manuscripts of the Vatican Library